Saint-Jeanvrin is a commune in the Cher department in the Centre-Val de Loire region of France.

Geography
The commune shares its western border with the department of Indre.

Population

Sights
 The church of St. Georges, dating from the twelfth century (Historic monument).
 The ruins of a fifteenth-century chateau.
 The Michel Langlois museum.

See also
Communes of the Cher department

References

External links

Annuaire Mairie website 

Communes of Cher (department)